Necmettin Erbakan University (Turkish Necmettin Erbakan Üniversitesi) is a public university in Konya, Turkey.

History 
Necmettin Erbakan University (NEU) was established as Konya University. On April 11, 2012, its name was changed to "Necmettin Erbakan University" in memory of former Prime Minister Necmettin Erbakan.

NEU is one of the three public universities in Konya.

Academic units 
As of 2021, the university has 20 faculties, 1 college, 4 institutes and 8 vocational schools and 1 music school.

Faculties 

 Ahmet Keleşoğlu Faculty of Education
 Ahmet Keleşoğlu Faculty of Theology
 Faculty of Dentistry
 Ereğli Faculty of Education
 Ereğli Faculty of Agriculture
 Faculty of Science
 Faculty of Fine Arts
 Faculty of Aeronautics and Astronautics
 Faculty of Nursing
 Faculty of Law
 Meram Faculty of Medicine
 Faculty of Engineering and Architecture
 Faculty of Health Sciences
 Seydişehir Ahmet Cengiz Faculty of Engineering
 Seydişehir Faculty of Health Sciences
 Faculty of Political Sciences
 Faculty of Social Sciences and Humanities
 Faculty of Tourism
 Faculty of Applied Sciences
 Faculty of Veterinary Medicine

Institutes 

 Institute of Education Sciences
 Institute of Science
 Institute of Health Sciences
 Institute of Social Sciences

College 

 Foreign languages

Music school 

 Conservatory

Vocational School 

 Justice Vocational School
 Ereğli Vocational School of Justice
 Ereğli Health Services Vocational School
 Konya Ereğli Kemal Akman Vocational School
 Meram Vocational School
 Health Services Vocational School
 Seydişehir Vocational School
 Seydişehir Health Services Vocational School

See also 

 List of universities in Turkey

References

External links 
 Necmettin Erbakan University Official Website (in English)

Universities and colleges in Turkey
2010 establishments in Turkey
Educational institutions established in 2010
Konya Province